Ljungdahl is a Swedish surname. Notable people with the surname include:

Axel Ljungdahl (1897–1995), a Swedish Air Force general
Carina Ljungdahl (born 1960), Swedish swimmer
Else-Marie Ljungdahl (born 1942), Swedish sprint canoeist

Swedish-language surnames